Western Brittonic languages comprise two dialects into which Common Brittonic split during the Early Middle Ages; its counterpart was the ancestor of the Southwestern Brittonic languages. The reason and date for the split is often given as the Battle of Deorham in 577, at which point the victorious Saxons of Wessex essentially cut Brittonic-speaking Britain in two, which in turn caused the Western and Southwestern branches to develop separately.

Southwestern Brittonic became the ancestor to Cornish and Breton.

Alan James has suggested that Cumbric and Pictish were closer aligned to one another than they were to Welsh.

References

 
Brittonic languages
Extinct Celtic languages
Languages attested from the 6th century
Languages extinct in the 8th century